Baron  was a career soldier in the early Imperial Japanese Army, serving during the Russo-Japanese War, and was an aide-de-camp to Emperor Taishō.

Biography 
Nakamura was born as the second son of a samurai of Hikone Domain (present-day Shiga Prefecture). Joining the fledgling Imperial Japanese Army in July 1871, he was promoted to corporal in November 1873. After attending the fledgling Imperial Japanese Army Academy, he was commissioned as a second lieutenant in November 1874. He fought as an officer in the IJA 2nd Brigade during the Satsuma Rebellion of 1877.   He was assigned to the Imperial Japanese Army General Staff Office from March 1879. After his promotion to major in May 1886, he became a battalion commander with the IJA 10th Infantry Regiment. He became a member of the staff of the IJA 1st Division in May 1888. He served as an instructor at the Army Staff College from December 1889. In April 1891, he served on the staff of the IJA 5th Division.

Nakamura was appointed aide-de-camp to the Crown Prince (the future Emperor Taishō in December 1891, and was promoted to lieutenant colonel in September 1892. During the First Sino-Japanese War, he served as Aide-de-camp to the Emperor of Japan from the end of October 1894 and was promoted to colonel in December of the same year. In April 1897, he was given command of the IJA 46th Infantry Regiment, which served as a garrison force in Taiwan. He was promoted to major general in September 1899. From April 1900, he was chief-of-staff of the military bureau of the Governor-General of Taiwan.

In March 1902, Nakamura was assigned command of the IJA 2nd Brigade, which deployed to Manchuria in March 1904 as part of the Japanese Third Army at the start of the Russo-Japanese War. The unit served with distinction during the Battle of Nanshan. Nakamura was himself wounded during the assault on the night of 26 November 1904, during which most of his 4,500 man unit was annihilated with no significant result.

In January 1907, Nakamura became commander of the IJA 15th Division. In September 1907, he was made a baron (danshaku) in the kazoku peerage system. At the end of December 1908, he was once again Aide-de-camp to the Emperor of Japan. In September 1914, he served as resident-general of the Kwantung Leased Territory. In January 1915, he was promoted to full general. During World War I he was appointed to sit the Supreme War Council in 1917. He entered the reserves in February 1919. On his death, he was posthumously awarded the Grand Cordon of the Order of the Rising Sun, Gold Rays.

References

Notes 

1854 births
1925 deaths
People from Shiga Prefecture
Japanese generals
Japanese military personnel of the Russo-Japanese War
Kazoku